Remsen-Union High School was a high school located in Remsen, Iowa.  It was a consolidation of the City of Remsen and the Township of Union. Remsen Union merged with the Marcus Meriden Cleghorn school district to start the 2016–17 school year. The former high school is now only a junior high school leaving St. Mary's to be the only high school left in Remsen.

Extracurricular activities
Student groups and activities include band, choir, DECA, H.A.V.E. (Humanitarian And Voluntary Experience) club, National Honor Society, quiz bowl, speech, and student council.

The Remsen-Union Rockets competed in baseball, basketball, cheerleading, dance team, football, golf, softball, track and field, and volleyball. They also shared a bowling, cross-country, and wrestling program with Marcus-Meriden-Cleghorn. The teams had a rivalry with local high schools Remsen St. Mary's and Marcus-Meriden-Cleghorn.

For classification in sports related to the IHSAA, they are classified as 8-man for football and class 1A for every other sport.

References

External links
Remsen-Union Community School District

Public high schools in Iowa
Schools in Plymouth County, Iowa